Hoffmannseggia is a genus of flowering plants in the pea family, Fabaceae, known generally as rushpeas. These are pod-bearing herbs and subshrubs native to the Americas and southern Africa.
The generic name honors Johann Centurius, Count of Hoffmannsegg, a nineteenth-century German nobleman and botanist.

Selected species
Hoffmannseggia comprises the following species:

 Hoffmannseggia aphylla (Phil.) G. P. Lewis & Sotuyo

 Hoffmannseggia arequipensis Ulibarri

 Hoffmannseggia doelli Phil.
 subsp. argentina Ulibarri
 subsp. doellii Phil.
 Hoffmannseggia drepanocarpa A. Gray—sicklepod holdback
 Hoffmannseggia drummondii Torr. & A. Gray—dwarf nicker
 Hoffmannseggia erecta Phil.
 Hoffmannseggia eremophila (Phil.) Burkart ex Ulibarri

 Hoffmannseggia glauca (Ortega) Eifert—Indian rushpea, pig-nut, hog potato

 Hoffmannseggia humilis (Mart. & Galeotti) Hemsl.

 Hoffmannseggia intricata Brandegee

 Hoffmannseggia microphylla Torr.—wand holdback
 Hoffmannseggia minor (Phil.) Ulibarri
 Hoffmannseggia miranda Sandwith

 Hoffmannseggia oxycarpa Benth.—sharppod rushpea
 subsp. arida (Rose) B. B. Simpson
 subsp. oxycarpa Benth.

 Hoffmannseggia peninsularis (Britton) Wiggins—Peninsular holdback

 Hoffmannseggia prostrata Lag. ex DC.

 Hoffmannseggia pumilio (Griseb.) B. B. Simpson
 Hoffmannseggia repens (Eastw.) Cockerell—creeping nicker

 Hoffmannseggia tenella Tharp & L. P. Williams—slender rushpea

 Hoffmannseggia trifoliata Cav.
 Hoffmannseggia viscosa (Ruiz & Pav.) Hook.
 Hoffmannseggia watsonii (Fisher) Rose
 Hoffmannseggia yaviensis Ulibarri

References

External links

Jepson Manual Treatment
USDA Plants Profile

Caesalpinieae
Fabaceae genera
Taxa named by Antonio José Cavanilles